Sav Remzi is a creative entrepreneur, record producer and impresario. He is responsible for a number of imprints over the past three decades, including the music label Nuphonic Records, the Blue Note ClubShoreditch, Xfm's London Xpress radio shows, Tirk Records, the Lovebox Festival, and the discovery of various hit artists including New Young Pony Club and Fujiya & Miyagi.

Whilst directing his Tirk Records label, Remzi also develops creative campaigns for brands which have included Virgin Media, Harvey Goldsmith, Pernod Ricard, Intel, Mazda, Stussy, Perry Ellis/Farah and Bowers & Wilkins. In 2013, he was appointed Founding Member at the not-for-profit members club, The House of St Barnabas in London's Soho. where Sav contributes music & content direction.

In 2018 Remzi published Goldie's critically acclaimed memoirs All Things Remembered on Faber & Faber. Since then, Sav has consulted creative concepts and audio installations for the new KOKO Camden and St John in HackneyChurch of St John-at-Hackney, whilst developing various other business projects including a new digital rights management system called Music Gain and consulting toCambridge Audio.

Career
In 1989, Remzi began working with early musical pioneers such as the late great Andrew Weatherall, Gilles Peterson and Norman Jay, hosting their residencies at his newly built jazz club the Red-Eye in Lewisham, South East London.

He went on to co-found the record label Nuphonic Records in 1993. Nuphonic's first release was Faze Action's club classic "In the Trees". In the following years, the label went on to release a broad spectrum of dance music ranging from Afro rhythms to house music. Nuphonic titles included David Mancuso's Loft series, Norman Jay's Good Times, Andrew Weatherall (RIP), Faze Action and Ashley Beedle. Nuphonic ceased operations in 2002.

In 1994, Remzi took charge of the Blue Note club in London's Hoxton Square. By hosting residencies from the likes of DJ Harvey, Weatherall, James Lavelle, Gilles Peterson, Goldie's 'Metalheadz', Talvin Singh's Anokha and Ninja Tune's Stealth, the club proved to be a platform from which audiences could sample the various new musical movements that were emerging at the time.

In 2000, Remzi secured the production of a new weekly radio show London Xpress, which launched the then-indie station Xfm's drive towards dance audiences. The show handed over the controls each week to key dance music legends including Groove Armada, Chemical Brothers, Basement Jaxx, Carl Craig, David Mancuso and aired for 2 years having landed a 'Best Radio Show' Sony Radio award in its first year on air.

In September 2000, Remzi acquired and built his own venue, the Bridge & Tunnel, a 400-capacity venue in London's Shoreditch. Previously a bank, the site was converted into a two-floor club/restaurant/bar. The club featured a state-of-the-art valve amp audio system and studio quality monitoring. It closed in 2003 due to neighbour objection to licensing.

Remzi A&R's his own record label Tirk Records, which was founded in 2003. The label's first signing, 2007 Mercury Award nominees New Young Pony Club, attracted critical acclaim with their singles 'Ice Cream' and 'The Get Go' which became instant hits. Tirk subsequently released Fujiya & Miyagi's album Transparent Things. The Tirk roster also include acts such as Richard Norris (Time & Space Machine), Architeq, Maurice Fulton, Tom Findlay (Groove Armada), Idjut Boys, The Bees, Escort, Greg Wilson (DJ), Chaz Jankel, and Martin Rushent.

In 2005 Remzi secured founding partnership in London's Lovebox Festival, facilitating its move to East Londons' Victoria Park and subsequent events up to 2008.

In 2008 Remzi was recruited as panel judge together with Carl Barat, The Charlatans, and other industry figures in Virgin Media's call for bands competition Road to V, where bands such as Bombay Bicycle Club and Young Knives were first aired. The show was an eight-part TV series aired on Channel 4.

Remzi now acts as music strategy consultant to various brands which have included Virgin Media, Mazda, Meantime Brewery, D&b audiotechnik, Bowers & Wilkins, John Lewis and Perry Ellis. Projects have included The Guardian and Intel for the creation of the world's first ever on-line festival, Secondfest,  which was aired live in June 2007 within the virtual environment of Second Life. Secondfest was subsequently awarded the AOP (Association of Online Publishers) prize for the 'Innovation' category.

Since 2012, Remzi has been Music Director and founding member of the not-for-profit social enterprise members club House of St Barnabas in London's Soho, which has a mission to break the cycle of homelessness. At HOSB Sav has programmed high-profile events, styled the club's music strategy and forged partnerships with the likes of NTS Live and Boiler Room, as well as appointing founding members Jarvis Cocker, Rob da Bank, Gilles Peterson, Andrew Weatherall and many others.

Between 2014 and 2016, Remzi joined Harvey Goldsmith where he programmed various John Lewis-sponsored festival events including Onblackheath Festival in South East London, and Onroundhay in Leeds. Onblackheath Remzi headlined the likes of Massive Attack, Elbow, Grace Jones, Madness, Gilles Peterson, Neneh Cherry, Jarvis Cocker and many more.

In 2016, Remzi was appointed music judge for Berwick Street Calling, alongside Primal Scream's Simone Butler.

2017 saw Remzi publish Goldie's memoirs, titled All Things Remembered, an explosive story of abuse, revenge, graffiti, breakdancing, gold teeth, sawn-off shotguns, car crashes, hot yoga, absent fatherhood and redemption through reality TV - all told in Goldie's unmistakeable, charismatic voice. on Faber & Faber.

In 2019 Remzi consulted for the WOMAD Festival, instigating a marketing partnership between Peter Gabriel's Real World and NTS. Most recently, Remzi has consulted on audio installations and creative strategy for the Mint Group at Koko and for St John at Hackney, a 2,000-capacity venue designed by John Pawson which opened in 2020.

References

English record producers
English people of Turkish descent
Living people
1964 births
British people of Turkish Cypriot descent